BloodRayne: Betrayal is a 2D side-scrolling platform game released in 2011. Arc System Works published the PlayStation 3 version in Japan under the name  on May 1, 2014. 

An enhanced version with the subtitle Fresh Bites was released on PlayStation 4, PlayStation 5, Xbox One, Xbox Series, Nintendo Switch and Windows on September 9, 2021.

Gameplay

BloodRayne: Betrayal is a side-scrolling platform game that keeps the hack and slash combat of the previous games in the series. The player controls Rayne through 15 "Chapters". With Rayne's arm blades and a handgun, the game will lock players in rooms full of enemies that will need to be taken down to progress through the levels. There are no new obtainable combat skills or new weapons throughout the game (aside from a light cannon that can be swapped with the handgun). The player can also find some collectibles that give upgrades like more ammo to the handgun.

Also, a great portion of the game's levels requires the players to be jumping from platform to platform, avoiding spikes, learning enemy placement, and projectiles in order to clear each "Chapter". Each one of the levels has multiple checkpoints that will replenish Rayne's life bar when you reach them. The player will be brought back to the checkpoint if all Rayne's health gauge is depleted or the player falls into a hole/acid pit/spikes etc. The health gauge can only be restored sucking the blood of some types of enemies after weakened them, the game does not feature any other item that can replenish health.

Plot
Rayne has to battle and feed in a brand new hack ‘n slash adventure. Slay ghastly enemies as Rayne, the dhampir with superhuman strength, speed, and agility, recruited by the vampire hunting Brimstone Society for one last mission. The target is a lavish, yet sinister ball in a secluded castle with plenty of dark and gruesome surprises. With the help of a mysterious friend and members of Brimstone, Rayne must infiltrate the manor, take out the fiendish horde, and stop an evil master plot once and for all.

Development and release

Fresh Bites

Announced at Limited Run Games’ E3 2021 show, this version of the game has updated 4K visuals, improved difficulty, and now fully voiced with Laura Bailey and Troy Baker reprising their roles as Rayne and Kagan respectively alongside more from the likes of Todd Haberkorn and Patrick Seitz to “bring new life to the original written dialog.”

Reception

The PS3 and Xbox 360 versions received "average" reviews, according to the review aggregation website Metacritic. Whereas some reviewers, such as those writing for Joystiq and IGN, praised the challenge of it, others, such as GameSpot, felt it was too frustrating. Jim Sterling, who at the time was a reviews editor for Destructoid, went so far as putting it on their top 10 worst games of 2011 for its terrible controls and handling and obscene number of enemies thrown at the player.

411Mania gave the PS3 version 8.5 out of ten and called it "a fantastic experience that old-school gamers shouldn't pass up". However, The Digital Fix gave the same console version 6 out of 10 and said it "will appeal to a particular kind of gaming masochist [...] For the rest of us, the imprecise controls, frequent deaths and lack of a difficulty selector make this an experience just too frustrating to be enjoyable". Metro gave the Xbox 360 version five out of ten: "Never has so promising a game been ruined by such a perversely high difficultly level, which is a crying shame given the gorgeous 2D art".

References

External links
Official website
Archived website

2011 video games
BloodRayne
Side-scrolling video games
Platform games
Hack and slash games
Nintendo Switch games
PlayStation 3 games
PlayStation 4 games
PlayStation 5 games
PlayStation Network games
Video games about vampires
Video game reboots
Video games scored by Jake Kaufman
Video games developed in the United States
WayForward games
Windows games
Xbox 360 games
Xbox 360 Live Arcade games
Xbox One games
Single-player video games
Majesco Entertainment games
Arc System Works games
Ziggurat Interactive games